Marie Wegener (born 6 July 2001) is a German singer who won the 15th season of Deutschland sucht den Superstar (the German version of Pop Idol and American Idol). She is the youngest winner of the show, the second minor to win, and its fourth female winner. Her winning song "Königlich" was produced by Dieter Bohlen.

Wegener is a former student of the Steinbart-Gymnasium in Duisburg.

In 2013, she took part in the first season of the German version of The Voice Kids, but lost during the Battle Round to Michèle Birner, who went on to win the show.

Songs performed on Deutschland sucht den Superstar

Discography

Albums 
 2018 – Königlich
 2019 – Countdown

Singles 
 2013 – "Christmas Morning"
 2017 – "Ich wohne in deinem Herzen"
 2018 – "Königlich"

References 

2001 births
German women pop singers
Deutschland sucht den Superstar winners
Living people
21st-century German women singers
People from Duisburg